This page lists the winners and nominees for the BAFTA Award for Best British Short Animation for each year since 1990 when the award was introduced. The British Academy of Film and Television Arts (BAFTA), is a British organisation that hosts annual awards shows for film, television, children's film and television, and interactive media.

In the following lists, the titles and names in bold with a dark grey background are the winners and recipients respectively; those not in bold are the remaining nominees. The winner is also the first name listed in each category.

The number of nominated films has varied over the course of the award. Four nominations were usual to begin with (with a total of 10 years with four nominations). More recently the number of nominations has been three. The most nominations were in 1997, when there were six nominations.

The award has had three different names since its inception including 'Best Short Animation', 'Best Short Animation Film' and, since 2014, 'Best British Short Animation'.

Winners and nominees

1980s
 Best Short Animation

1990s

2000s

 Best Short Animation Film

 Best Short Animation

2010s

 Best British Short Animation

2020s

See also
Academy Award for Best Animated Short Film

Notes

References

External links
 Explore the BAFTA official archive
 BAFTA Awards, Internet Movie Database

British Academy Film Awards
Awards established in 1990
Animated short film awards